The 2014 United States House of Representatives election in North Dakota was held on Tuesday, November 4, 2014, to elect the U.S. representative from North Dakota's at-large congressional district, who will represent the state of North Dakota in the 114th United States Congress. The election coincided with all other states' House of Representatives elections. Incumbent Republican representative Kevin Cramer, who has served in the seat since 2013, ran for re-election to a second two-year term in office. Cramer became the first Republican congressman to be re-elected in North Dakota since 1978.

Republican primary

Candidates

Declared
 Kevin Cramer, incumbent U.S. Representative

Withdrew
 DuWayne Hendrickson (did not make the ballot)

Results

Democratic-Nonpartisan League primary

Candidates

Declared
 George B. Sinner, state senator and son of former governor of North Dakota George A. Sinner

Declined
 Tom Fiebiger, former state senator
 Jasper Schneider, state director of the USDA Rural Development and former state representative
 Mac Schneider, Minority Leader of the North Dakota Senate
 Ryan Taylor, rancher, former Minority Leader of the North Dakota Senate and nominee for governor in 2012 (running for Agriculture Commissioner)

Results

Libertarian nomination

Candidates

Declared
 Jack Seaman, businessman

Results

General election

Polling

Results

References

External links
U.S. House elections in North Dakota, 2014 at Ballotpedia
Campaign contributions at OpenSecrets

North Dakota
2014
United States House